Phanes is a genus of skippers in the family Hesperiidae.

Species
Recognised species in the genus Phanes include:
 Phanes aletes (Geyer, 1832)

Former species
Phanes tavola (Schaus, 1902) - transferred to Tava tavola (Schaus, 1902)

References

Natural History Museum Lepidoptera genus database

Hesperiinae
Hesperiidae genera